Larnie Lee Jordan (April 23, 1914 – February 8, 1987), nicknamed "Boo", was an American Negro league shortstop between 1936 and 1942.

A native of Valdosta, Georgia, Jordan made his Negro leagues debut in 1936 with the Philadelphia Bacharach Giants. He played for the Philadelphia Stars in 1940 and 1941, and finished his career with the New York Black Yankees in 1942. Jordan died in Philadelphia, Pennsylvania in 1987 at age 72.

References

External links
 and Baseball-Reference Black Baseball stats and Seamheads

1914 births
1987 deaths
Bacharach Giants players
New York Black Yankees players
Philadelphia Stars players
Baseball shortstops
Baseball players from Georgia (U.S. state)
People from Valdosta, Georgia
20th-century African-American sportspeople